Allium micranthum is a plant species native to Pakistan and Afghanistan. It is a perennial herb with an egg-shaped bulb about 10 mm across. Scape is up to 40 cm tall. Leaves are narrowly linear, up to 3 mm across. Umbels are almost spherical with many flowers crowded together. Tepals are tiny, no more than 3 mm long, purple.

References

micranthum
Onions
Flora of Afghanistan
Flora of Pakistan
Plants described in 1959